CUTV can refer to:

 Coventry University Television, Television Station of Coventry University in Coventry, UK.
 Concordia University Television, Television Station of Concordia University in Montreal, Quebec, Canada.
 California University Television, Television station of California University of Pennsylvania in California, Pennsylvania.
 Cardiff Union TV, Television station of Cardiff University in Cardiff, Wales.